Marco Suppini (born 13 September 1998) is an Italian sports shooter. He competed in the men's 10 metre air rifle event at the 2020 Summer Olympics.

References

External links
 

1998 births
Living people
Italian male sport shooters
Olympic shooters of Italy
Shooters at the 2020 Summer Olympics
Sportspeople from the Metropolitan City of Bologna
Shooters at the 2014 Summer Youth Olympics
21st-century Italian people